Khao Lak is a series of villages, now tourist-oriented, mainly in the Takua Pa District and partly in the Thai Mueang District of Phang Nga Province, Thailand.

The name "Khao Lak" literally translated means 'Main Mountain'. This was one of the peaks used by ancient sea farers as a landmark to guide them into the safe harbor at Thaplamu. Lak mountain is one of the main peaks in the hilly small mountainous region (maximum height  in Khao Lak-Lam Ru National Park. 

The tiny village of Ban Khao Lak, the original beach, Hat Khao Lak, and the bay of Khao Lak (Ao Khao Lak) actually all lie in the Lam Kaen sub-district of Thai Mueang District. However the name Khao Lak has now grown to enclose many other villages in the area, mostly on the Northern side of the mountain in the Khukkhak sub-district of Takuapa district.

Location 
Khao Lak is located in Phang Nga Province of Southern Thailand. Approximately 100km from the Island of Phuket, 130km from Krabi town and 30km from the old tin mining town of Takuapa.

Beaches 

Beach boundaries are fluid, and vary with local prejudices, official government pronouncements,  and the marketing efforts of local resorts. It is generally accepted that Khao Lak beaches include (from south to north):

 Khao Lak Beach, south of the headland marking the southern boundary of the region
 Nang Thong Beach, in the village of Bang La On (frequently called—mistakenly—Khao Lak)
 Bang Niang, in the village of the same name some 2–3 km (1.5 to 2 miles) north of Bang La On
 Khuk Khak, in the village of the same name some 2–3 km (1.5 to 2 miles) north of Bang Niang
 Cape Pakarang, north of Khuk Khak
 Bang Sak, north of Cape Pakarang

Taken together, these beaches stretch for some  along the Andaman Sea. All beaches are public, as are all beaches in Thailand.

Economy 
Since the tsunami, Khao Lak's infrastructure and economy have bounced back. Coastal resorts have been reconstructed or repaired, and new ones have been built or are in the process of being built. In 2016, there were reportedly 7,822 hotel rooms at 104 registered accommodations. Occupancy rates range from 70-90 percent during the high season period (November–March).

History
The lush area around Khao Lak was once called Takola. Artifacts dating back to 1,400 years show evidence it was a significant coastal town and trading post of the ancient Maritime Silk Route. 

In 1987, over nine huts were found inside cashew nut trees of Khao Lak Resort, which are one of the most beautiful areas of forest where species of Thai wildlife are a common sight. Khao Lak was mentioned for the first time in 1988 in the second edition of Traveller Handbuch Thailand by Stefan Loose Verlag.

2004 tsunami

Khao Lak was the coastal area of Thailand hardest hit by the tsunami resulting from the 26 December 2004 Indian Ocean earthquake.  Many people died including many foreign tourists. The final death toll was over 4,000, with local unofficial estimates topping 10,000 due to the lack of accurate government censuses and the fact that much of the migrant Burmese population was not documented nor recognized as legal residents.

Most of the coastal landscape was destroyed by the tsunami. Some replanting programmes have been initiated and a great deal has been accomplished in the rejuvenation of surrounding foliage. Studies suggesting that coastal vegetation may have helped buffer the effects of the waves have ensured that replanting and maintenance of the coastal vegetation have become a priority in the reconstruction of the landscape.
It was on patrol, guarding Bhumi Jensen, a grandson of the king, as he was jet skiing in front of La Flora Resort. Despite rescue efforts, he could not be saved. His mother, Princess Ubol Ratana, and sister survived by fleeing to an upper story of La Flora. The area in which the patrol boat lies has been renovated and includes a museum dedicated to the events of 26 December.

Others among the casualties were well-known Finnish musician and TV host Aki Sirkesalo and his family, and Imre von Polgar, guitarist for the Swedish rock band, The Watermelon Men. Almost four years old at the time, a young girl was swept away at Khao Lak and remained the subject of a media-covered intensive search despite being formally identified in August 2005 as a victim. Jane Holland (nee Attenborough) the elder daughter of the film director and actor Richard Attenborough perished in the tsunami with several members of her family. The current President of Finland Sauli Niinistö and his adult son survived by clinging to a power pole. Since the 2004 tsunami, an early-warning system has been installed along the affected coastline. In April 2012, it received its most recent test following an earthquake off the coast of Sumatra. Audible warning sirens alerted the local population to the possibility of a tsunami roughly 2 hours before estimated landfall, allowing the populace to move to higher ground inland.

The 2012 film The Impossible is based on the true story of the family of María Belón, who survived the 2004 tsunami, and was also filmed in Khao Lak.

Administration 
The Khao Lak region falls almost entirely within the Khuk Khak Sub-district (tambon) of the Takua Pa District (amphoe) of Phang Nga Province. The Takua Pa District is divided into eight sub-districts. The village of Ban Khao Lak does not fall within the Khuk Khak sub-district, the area commonly thought of as "Khao Lak".

Weather in Khao Lak 
The weather in Khao Lak can be separated into two distinct seasons. The dry season between November and April, and the monsoon season from May to October. Khao Lak is mostly warm all year round with temperatures averaging around 28°C to 32°C.

In the dry season it is not uncommon for Khao Lak to go without rain for around six weeks at a time. This is the main tourist season when the weather is more settled. During this time the wind generally comes from the East, meaning the town is sheltered by its position on the Western side of the mountains near the coast. 

In the monsoon season however the wind changes direction and comes from the West where it reflects off of the mountains and causes strong winds, waves and storm like conditions in the area.

References

External links 

A detailed map of the Khao Lak area 
A detailed map showing Khao Lak at the time of the 2004 tsunami
Photos of the rescue work after the tsunami 
National Geographic Society: The Deadliest Tsunami in History
Discovery Travel Khao Lak - Khao Lak Weather

Beaches of Thailand
Tourist attractions in Phang Nga province
Geography of Phang Nga province
Populated places in Phang Nga province